Mislata Club de Fútbol is a Spanish football team based in Mislata, in the Valencian Community, Spain. Founded in 1945 and plays in Regional Preferente – Group 2, the fourth tier of the Spanish football league system.

Season to season

2 seasons in Tercera División

Notable former players
 Sergio Hinestrosa
 Omar Monterde

External links
Official website 
Futbolme.com profile 

Football clubs in the Valencian Community
Association football clubs established in 1945
Divisiones Regionales de Fútbol clubs
1945 establishments in Spain
Province of Valencia